Sergei Vladislavovich Smelov (born 20 May 1969 in Moscow) is a Russian football coach and a former player.

References

1969 births
Footballers from Moscow
Living people
Soviet footballers
FC Dynamo Moscow reserves players
FC Dinamo Sukhumi players
Russian footballers
FC Tekstilshchik Kamyshin players
Russian Premier League players
FC Chernomorets Novorossiysk players
FC Khimki players
Association football goalkeepers